Eidskog is a municipality in Innlandet county, Norway. It is located in the traditional district of Vinger. The administrative centre of the municipality is the village of Skotterud. Other villages in the municipality include Magnor, Matrand, and Åbogen.

The  municipality is the 181st largest by area out of the 356 municipalities in Norway. Eidskog is the 155th most populous municipality in Norway with a population of 6,032.

General information
The municipality was established on 1 January 1864 when the old Vinger Municipality was divided in two: Vinger (population: 6,226) in the north and Eidskog (population: 6,920) in the south. On 1 January 1986, the northern part of the Åbogen area (population: 14) was transferred from Kongsvinger Municipality to Eidskog Municipality.

Name
The municipality was named Eidskog (historically spelled Eidskogen). Thus the name means "the woods with the many ".

Coat of arms
The coat of arms was granted on 12 September 1986. The arms show a gray background with a black grouse, a common inhabitant of the many forests in the municipality. Forestry is also one of the main sources of income in the area.

Churches
The Church of Norway has two parishes within the municipality of Eidskog. It is part of the Solør, Vinger og Odal prosti (deanery) in the Diocese of Hamar.

Geography
The municipality is located in the southeastern part of Innlandet county. It is bordered to the north by the municipality of Kongsvinger (in Innlandet) and in the west by Aurskog-Høland, Nes (both in Viken and Sør-Odal (in Innlandet). Eidskog also borders Sweden, both to the east and south.

The lakes Digeren, Mangen, and Skjervangen are all located in Eidskog.

History

The name Eidskog is ancient and was used for the southern part of Vinger, the region between today's Kongsvinger in Norway and Arvika in Sweden. The Vinger Royal Road historically traveled through Eidskog (and continues today as the Norwegian National Road 2). It was one of the most important traffic arteries between Norway and Sweden. The name Eidskog was already in use during the saga period and became, after the canonization of Saint Olaf and important pilgrim's route from Europe to Nidaros Cathedral. During the 12th century, the Eidskog Church was built. It was a stave church built in Midtskog (which means ). The present Eidskog Church is built on the same site (now called Matrand) and this building was constructed in 1665.

The way through Eidskog was also militarily important and many times through history has been the point of Swedish strikes into Hedmark. To defend against these assaults, a number of fortifications were built in the vicinity, including ones at Magnor and Matrand, but the chief fortification was Kongsvinger Fortress (to the north).

The last Swedish attack through Eidskog was in 1814 when Major General Carl Pontus Gahn on July 31 crossed the border and marched against Kongsvinger. His forces were stopped at Lier outside Kongsvinger on 2 August 1814 by troops led by Lieutenant Colonel Andreas Samuel Krebs (1769-1818) and retreated to Eidskog. On 4 August 1814, Krebs followed after to drive Swedish troops off Norwegian territory. The two forces met in the Battle of Matrand which was the bloodiest battle of the war and ended with a Norwegian victory.

Later in 1814, Norway was joined in union with Sweden and the confrontations at the Eidskog border ended.

The Soot Canal, constructed in 1849, has Norway's oldest sluice gates. It was the work of Engebret Soot (1786–1859). It was built to allow timber to be transported (floated) to the Halden sawmills.

The route through Eidskog became an important connection between the two countries; this was strengthened with the opening of the Grenseban railway in 1862, which connected Christiania to Stockholm.

Government
All municipalities in Norway, including Eidskog, are responsible for primary education (through 10th grade), outpatient health services, senior citizen services, unemployment and other social services, zoning, economic development, and municipal roads. The municipality is governed by a municipal council of elected representatives, which in turn elects a mayor.  The municipality falls under the Romerike og Glåmdal District Court and the Eidsivating Court of Appeal.

Municipal council
The municipal council  of Eidskog is made up of 25 representatives that are elected to four year terms. The party breakdown of the council is as follows:

Mayors
The mayors of Eidskog:

1864-1872: Henry T. Fearnley
1872-1879: Haagen Pedersen Malmer
1879-1895: Meldal Johnsen
1895-1897: O. Løken
1897-1905: Hans Taugbøl
1905-1907: O. Løken
1908-1913: Otto Pramm
1913-1915: Ole Syversen Fagernæs (V)
1915: M. T. Huse
1915-1916: Olof Nilsson
1917-1919: Otto Pramm
1920-1922: H. A. Rambøl
1923-1928: Thorvald Taugbøl
1929-1934: Kaspar Billerud
1935-1945: Selmer Alm (Ap)
1945-1947: Hallgrim Sørli (Ap)
1948-1963: Sigurd Skjørberg
1964-1981: Ivar Delviken
1982-1983: Kaare Fjeld
1984-1999: Kåre Delviken
1999-2005: Ivar Skulstad (Ap)
2005-2007: Greta Storm Ofteland (Ap)
2007-2015: Knut Gustav Woie (Sp)
2015–present: Kamilla Thue (Ap)

Attractions
 Soot Canal - the first lock constructed in Norway, used for log floating 
 Grenselosmuseet - museum on the route for escape to Sweden during the World War II
 Oppistun Børli - poet Hans Børli's home
 Morokulien -  memorial to the long lasting peace with Sweden
 Rønning Treski - last wood ski producer in Norway

Notable residents

 Erik Werenskiold (1855 in Eidskog – 1938) a Norwegian painter and illustrator
 Konrad Hirsch (1900 in Eidskog – 1924) Swedish footballer, played in 1924 Summer Olympics
 Julla Sæthern (1901 in Eidskog – 1981) a Norwegian barrister, feminist and politician
 Hans Børli (1918  at Eidskog – 1989) a Norwegian poet, writer and lumberjack 
 Torgrim Sollid (born 1942 in Eidskog) a composer and folk and jazz musician 
 Ivar Skulstad (born 1953) politician, Mayor of Eidskog 1999 to 2005
 Kristin Solli Schøien (born 1954) an author and composer, lives in Eidskog
 Max Ivan Lindkjølen (born 1956) chef and entrepreneur 
 Remi Eriksen (born 1967) Group President and CEO of DNV GL, a classification society
 Wilhelm Brenna (born 1979) a retired Norwegian ski jumper, junior world champion
 Andreas Ulvo (born 1983) a jazz pianist, organist, keyboardist and composer

References

External links

Municipal fact sheet from Statistics Norway 
Culture in Eidskog on the map 

 
Municipalities of Innlandet
1864 establishments in Norway